The 1956–57 Nationalliga A season was the 19th season of the Nationalliga A, the top level of ice hockey in Switzerland. Eight teams participated in the league, and EHC Arosa won the championship.

Regular season

Relegation 
 Grasshopper-Club - Lausanne HC 3:11

External links
 Championnat de Suisse 1956/57

National League (ice hockey) seasons
Swiss
1956–57 in Swiss ice hockey